Conch, or conque, also known as a "seashell horn" or "shell trumpet", is a wind instrument that is made from a conch, the shell of several different kinds of sea snails. Their natural conical bore is used to produce a musical tone. Conch shell trumpets have been played in many Pacific Island countries, as well as South America and Southern Asia.

The shells of large marine gastropods are blown into as if it were a trumpet, as in blowing horn. A completely unmodified conch may be used, or a mouth hole may be created. Wooden, bamboo, or metal mouthpieces may be inserted into the end of the shell. Embouchure is used to produce notes from the harmonic series. A tone hole may be added to change the fundamental frequency but globally this is extremely rare.

Various species of large marine gastropod shells can be turned into "blowing shells", but some of the more commonly used species include triton ('trumpet shell'), cassis ('helmet shell') and strombus ('true conch')."

Prehistory 

Shell trumpets have been known since the Magdalenian period (Upper Paleolithic), one example being the "conch Marsoulas", an archeological Charonia lampas shell trumpet which is on display at the Museum de Toulouse. In Israel/Palestine, the [Charonia tritonis nodifera] conch trumpet dates from approximately the third millennium BC.

India, Nepal and Tibet

The sacred chank, Turbinella pyrum, is known in India as the shankha (first mentioned in the Artharvaveda, c. 1000 BCE). In the Mahabharata, Lord Krishna blew the conch shell to announce the start and end of battles. In Tibet it is known as dung-dkar or dungkar.

Mesoamerica

Throughout Mesoamerican history, conch trumpets were used, often in a ritual context (see figure). In Ancient Maya art, such conches were often decorated with ancestral images; scenes painted on vases show hunters and hunting deities blowing the conch trumpet. Quechua (Inca descendants) and Warao still use the conch.

The Caribbean
The Queen Conch Strombus gigas was, and sometimes still is, used as a trumpet in the West Indies and other parts of the Caribbean. The Arawak word ‘fotuto’ was used to describe this instrument, and is still used to this day to refer to conch horns, and analogously, to bullhorns.

The Pacific Ocean area

The Triton shell, also known as "Triton's trumpet" Charonia tritonis, is used as a trumpet in Melanesian and Polynesian culture, and also in Korea and Japan. In Japan this kind of trumpet is known as the horagai, which spread across Asia with Buddhism (first mentioned during the Heian period (794–1185 CE)). Shingon Buddhist priests practice a ritual known as homa, which sometimes includes beating drums and blowing horagai. In Korea it is known as the nagak. In some Polynesian islands it is known as "pu".

Conch shell trumpets were historically used throughout Oceania, in countries such as Fiji. The shells are still blown in Fijian resorts as a performance for tourists. The Fijians also used the conch shell when the chief died: the chief's body would be brought down a special path and the conch would be played until the chief's body reached the end of the path.

Australia appears to be the only country in Oceania where conch shells were not used as a musical instrument, despite the widespread availability of shells.

Africa
Austronesian settlers to the island of Madagascar brought along their conch shell which eventually became the antsiva (in the west coast) or bankora which was blown customarily as part of ceremonies such as circumcisions and funerals. It was also incorporated into Merina royal regalia exclusively blown by male slaves to herald a royal's arrival, signalling mourning in time of death or even to mark battles.

Europe

Malta
In Malta the instrument is called a bronja, colloquially known as tronga. The shell of a sea snail is modified, with a hole at one end, and when blown it creates a loud noise. The tronja was generally used to inform the people that the windmills on the islands are operating that day due to being a windy day, which allows the grain of wheat and other grains to be ground.

Modern use

Carlos Chávez substitutes a conch for the trombone in his 1940 piece Xochipilli. American jazz trombonist Steve Turre also plays conches, in particular with his group Sanctified Shells. The group released its first, eponymous album in 1993.

An Indian conch, partially processed via an Echoplex delay, was featured prominently in the score for the film Alien (1979). Initially, composer Jerry Goldsmith used the conch during a scene depicting the extraterrestrial environment of a derelict spaceship. However, director Ridley Scott was so impressed by the eerie effect that he requested its use throughout the rest of the score, including during the main titles.

Media

References

External links

 Masterclass with Steve Turre: Making Music with Shells
 "Sea Trumpets" for software samplers Kontakt or Sforzando

Mollusc shells
Natural horns and trumpets
Sacred musical instruments

es:Bucio